Big Problems may refer to:
Big Problems – An Advice Podcast, a podcast co-hosted by Stephen Tobolowsky
Big Problems Big Thinkers, American television show hosted by Terre Blair
"Big Problems", a song by Corrosion of Conformity from the album Clerks: Music from the Motion Picture
"Big Problems", a song by DJ Kay Slay and Greg Street from the album The Champions: North Meets South